Bălcăuți may refer to:

Bălcăuți, a commune in Suceava County, Romania
Bălcăuți, a commune in Briceni district, Moldova
Balkivtsi (Bălcăuți in Romanian), a commune in Dnistrovskyi Raion, Chernivtsi Oblast, Ukraine